Grzegorz Kacała (born 15 March 1966) is a Polish former professional rugby union and rugby league footballer who played in the 1990s, and has coached rugby union in the 2000s and 2010s. He was born on 15 March 1966. In rugby union, his position was in the back row, usually Number 8.

A French championship Title private following a refereeing error with Grenoble 1993 
He play for FC Grenoble and despite overpowering pack called the Mammoths of Grenoble his club tilts on the score of 14-11.
A try of Olivier Brouzet is denied to Grenoble and the decisive try by Gary Whetton was awarded by the referee, Daniel Salles, when in fact the defender Franck Hueber from Grenoble touched down the ball first in his try zone.
This error gave the title to Castres. Salles admitted the error 13 years later.
Jacques Fouroux the coach of FC Grenoble in conflict with the Federation and who was already suspicious before the match of the referee cry out conspiracy.

He was the first Polish player to play in the rugby league Super League when he played for Paris Saint-Germain in the first season of 1996's Super League I, as a forward.

Winners of the Heineken Cup with Brive 1997 
He is the only Polish player to have been on a Heineken Cup winning team, in 1997. He did so with CA Brive. He was named man of the match in the final against Leicester Tigers. He currently coaches in Poland at Lechia Gdańsk (2009/2010). He also played with Cardiff RFC. He started his professional career in the Polish League.

Currently Kacala has been a member of the Polish Rugby Union .

Clubs
Lechia Gdańsk
Ogniwo Sopot
Club Olympique Creusot Bourgogne
FC Grenoble
Paris Saint-Germain (RL)
CA Brive
Cardiff RFC

Achievements
French premiership 1993 Runners-up - FC Grenoble
Heineken Cup 1997 - CA Brive
Welsh Scottish League (now Pro14) 1998 - Cardiff RFC
Polish Cup x 2- Ogniwo Sopot
Polish League - Ogniwo Sopot

References

1966 births
Cardiff RFC players
Expatriate rugby league players in France
Expatriate rugby union players in France
Expatriate rugby union players in Wales
Lechia Gdańsk rugby players
Living people
Paris Saint-Germain Rugby League players
Polish expatriate rugby union players
Polish expatriate sportspeople in France
Polish expatriate sportspeople in Wales
Polish rugby league players
Polish rugby union players
Sportspeople from Gdańsk